Roscoe Mitchell and the Sound and Space Ensembles is an album by jazz saxophonist Roscoe Mitchell recorded in 1983 for the Italian Black Saint label.

Reception
The Allmusic review by Brian Olewnick awarded the album 3 stars stating "For serious Mitchell fans, this is worth having for the highlights; newcomers might find an easier "in" with the slightly earlier and utterly wonderful Snurdy McGurdy and Her Dancin' Shoes on Nessa".

Track listing
All compositions by Roscoe Mitchell
 "Words" - 11:18 
 'You Wastin' My Tyme" - 4:06 
 "Views A, B, C" - 4:32 
 "Line Fine Lyon Seven" - 8:03 
 "View D" - 2:13 
 "Variations on Sketches from Bamboo" - 12:13
Recorded at Barigozzi Studio in Milano, Italy on June 2 & 3, 1983

Personnel
Roscoe Mitchell – soprano saxophone, alto saxophone, tenor saxophone, bass saxophone, vocals
Michael Mossman - trumpet, flugelhorn, piccolo trumpet, percussion (tracks 2–6)
Gerald Oshita - tenor saxophone, baritone saxophone contrabass sarrusophone, mezzo-soprano Conn-o-saxophone (tracks 1, 2, 4 & 6)
Spencer Barefield - guitar, percussion, vocals (tracks 2–6)
Jaribu Shahid - bass, electric bass, percussion, vocals (tracks 2–6)
Tani Tabbal - drums, bongos, vocals (tracks 2–6)  
Tom Buckner - voice (tracks 1 & 6)

References

Black Saint/Soul Note albums
Roscoe Mitchell albums
1983 albums